Thomas Danby may refer to:
 Sir Thomas Danby (c. 1530–1590), son of Christopher Danby and High Sheriff of Yorkshire, 1575–1576
 Sir Thomas Danby (died 1660) (1610–1660), English landowner a Royalist, briefly a member of parliament for Richmond, Yorkshire
Thomas Danby (mayor) (1631–1667), mayor of Leeds, England and MP in 1661 for Malton
Thomas Danby (artist) (1818–1886), English landscape painter
Leeds Thomas Danby, college in Leeds, predecessor of Leeds City College

See also
Tom Danby (Thompson Danby, 1926–2022), English rugby player